The women's 20 kilometres points race competition at the 2010 Asian Games was held on 16 November at the Guangzhou Velodrome.

Schedule
All times are China Standard Time (UTC+08:00)

Results
Legend
DNF — Did not finish

References

External links 
Results

Track Women points race